Diana Ser (born 26 April 1972) is a journalist, Channel NewsAsia presenter, as well as former Television Corporation of Singapore (TCS) actress and host. She was a prominent full-time Mediacorp artiste from 1990 to 2008. She left Mediacorp in 2008 and now runs a communications consulting and media training company.

She was last seen on local television in 2008, where she co-hosted an episode of Glamour Mum and The Dude on MediaCorp Channel 8 with Bryan Wong.

Personal life
Diana Ser's father is Chinese and her mother has English blood. Ser attended CHIJ Saint Nicholas Girls' School, Victoria Junior College, the National University of Singapore (NUS) and the Nanyang Technological University (NTU) of Singapore. In 2005, she was awarded the Nanyang Alumni Award from NTU, where she received a Masters in Mass Communication.

On 27 June 2004, Ser married former Singaporean actor James Lye after a nine-year courtship. The couple have a son Jake and two daughters Christy and Jaymee.

Accolades

References

CHIJ Saint Nicholas Girls' School alumni
Victoria Junior College alumni
National University of Singapore alumni
Nanyang Technological University alumni
Living people
Singaporean television personalities
Singaporean people of Chinese descent
1973 births